Municipal elections were held on 3 March 2019 in Tuzi Municipality. These elections were called by President of Montenegro Milo Đukanović for 3 March 2019, after Tuzi became an independent municipality on 1 September 2018.

Participants

Albanian minority parties 
On 21 December 2018, two political parties representing the Albanian minority in Montenegro, Albanian Alternative (ASH) and Democratic League of Albanians (LDSH) formed a pre-election alliance named Albanian Forum, under the leadership of Nik Gjeloshaj. Democratic Union of Albanians (UDSH) joined the Forum on 28 January 2019. The alliance ran in the elections as "Malësia unites us".

Results

Tuzi

Notes

References

Montenegro
Municipal
Montenegro
Local elections in Montenegro